Ferrell North America performs propane trading and distribution for more than 600 Ferrellgas locations. Founded in Houston, Texas in 1977, Ferrell North America also purchases, trades, sells, stores, and transports natural gas liquids and oil refinery feedstocks in conjunction with major oil companies, petrochemical manufacturers, gas processors, and other retail propane companies.

Ferrell North America moved its operations from Houston to the Ferrellgas corporate headquarters in Overland Park, Kansas in 2005.

External links
 Ferrell North America Web site
 Ferrellgas Web site

Energy companies of the United States
Companies based in Kansas
1977 establishments in Texas
2005 establishments in Kansas